Ihr Auftrag, Pater Castell is a German television series.

See also
List of German television series

References

External links
 

2007 German television series debuts
2010 German television series endings
German crime television series
2000s German police procedural television series
German-language television shows
ZDF original programming